"Somewhere in the Night" is a ballad written by Richard Kerr and lyricist Will Jennings which was a US Top 20 hit for both Helen Reddy and Barry Manilow.

The first song composed by Kerr and Jennings as a team, "Somewhere in the Night" appeared on four 1975 album releases: You Are a Song by Batdorf & Rodney, Rising Sun by Yvonne Elliman, No Way to Treat a Lady by Helen Reddy released July 1975 and Kim Carnes' November 1975 eponymous album release. The Yvonne Elliman version was released as a single in August 1975 which month also saw the release of a "Somewhere in the Night" single recorded by the song's co-writer Richard Kerr: Kerr's version would have its UK release in January 1976 when it also served as the title cut of an album release by Kerr. However, "Somewhere in the Night" did not appear on any chart until the Batdorf & Rodney version was issued as a single in October 1975 and reached #69 on the Billboard Hot 100.

The qualified success of the Batdorf & Rodney version did not preclude the December 1975 release of Helen Reddy's version of "Somewhere in the Night" as the follow-up single to her hit "Ain't No Way to Treat a Lady". Unique as a third single released from a Helen Reddy album - the first single from the No Way to Treat a Lady album, "Bluebird", had an abbreviated release - "Somewhere in the Night" hit #2 at Easy Listening radio and #19 on the Billboard Hot 100 in early 1976. Reddy would have one subsequent single reach the Top 20, that being "You're My World" in 1977. "Somewhere in the Night" would also reach #27 in New Zealand in February 1976, affording Reddy her final hit in that territory.

Barry Manilow, whose breakout hit "Mandy" had been written by Scott English and Richard Kerr, and who later reached #1 with the Kerr/Jennings composition "Looks Like We Made It", recorded "Somewhere in the Night" for his 1978 album Even Now. In July 1978 Manilow's version of "Somewhere in the Night" was issued as the flip of Manilow's single "Copacabana" for its release in the UK where both sides of the single received airplay although the single only reached a UK chart peak of #42. In December 1978 "Somewhere in the Night" became the fourth track from Even Now to be given single release in the US, reaching #9 on Billboard'''s Hot 100 in early 1979. Manilow's follow-up single would also have a Hot 100 peak of #9 after which Manilow would return to the US Top Ten for one final time with "I Made It Through the Rain" - #10 in 1980.

According to liner notes on the Even Now album, personnel on Manilow's recording include:

Barry Manilow – vocals, piano
Jeff Mironov – guitar 
Bob Babbitt – bass 
Paul Shaffer – electric piano 
Jimmy Young – drums 
Jimmy Maelen – percussion
Dick Behrke - orchestrationCash Box'' said that Manilow's version "develops into an emotional, dramatic work which climaxes at the chorus."

The song has also been recorded by Anita Sarawak. Mike Love, a local singer from Abertillery, South Wales recorded a version of the song in his bedroom and in 2014 the recording was played at his own funeral; this recording later went on to become very popular on YouTube.

References

External links
 
 

Barry Manilow songs
Helen Reddy songs
1975 singles
1976 singles
1979 singles
Songs with lyrics by Will Jennings
Songs written by Richard Kerr (songwriter)
Song recordings produced by Joe Wissert
Song recordings produced by Ron Dante
Capitol Records singles
Arista Records singles
1975 songs
Songs about nights